Trout Creek is a  southeastward-flowing stream originating in the Santa Cruz Mountains, a tributary of Los Gatos Creek in Santa Clara County, California. From its confluence with Los Gatos Creek, its waters flow to the Guadalupe River and thence through San Jose, California to south San Francisco Bay.

History
Trout Creek is likely named for local steelhead trout (Oncorhynchus mykiss), and is one of over 25 named Trout Creeks in California.

Watershed and course 
Trout Creek begins southeast of and below the  El Sereno Summit in El Sereno Open Space Preserve near the top of Montevina Road in the Santa Cruz Mountains. It joins lower Los Gatos Creek just below (north of) Leniham Dam on Lexington Reservoir.

Ecology and conservation 
Trout Creek could serve as an important wildlife linkage undercrossing to reduce wildlife-vehicle collisions on Highway 17. Trout Creek runs through protected San Jose Water District lands on the west side of the highway, and on the east side of the highway lie the conserved lands of St. Joseph's Hill Open Space Preserve.

See also 
 Lexington Reservoir
 Guadalupe River

References

External links
 El Sereno Open Space Preserve
 St. Joseph's Hill Open Space Preserve

Rivers of Santa Clara County, California
Santa Cruz Mountains
Rivers of the San Francisco Bay Area
Rivers of Northern California